Larisa Viktorovna Korobeynikova (born 26 March 1987) is a Russian right-handed foil fencer, two-time team European champion, three-time team world champion, 2021 team Olympic champion, and 2021 individual Olympic bronze medalist.

Medal record

Olympic Games

World Championship

European Championship

Grand Prix

World Cup

References

External links
 
 
  (archive)
  (archive)
 
 

Russian female foil fencers
Living people
People from Kurgan, Kurgan Oblast
Olympic fencers of Russia
Fencers at the 2012 Summer Olympics
Olympic silver medalists for Russia
Olympic medalists in fencing
1987 births
Medalists at the 2012 Summer Olympics
Universiade medalists in fencing
Recipients of the Medal of the Order "For Merit to the Fatherland" I class
Universiade silver medalists for Russia
Medalists at the 2009 Summer Universiade
Medalists at the 2013 Summer Universiade
Fencers at the 2020 Summer Olympics
Medalists at the 2020 Summer Olympics
Olympic gold medalists for the Russian Olympic Committee athletes
Olympic bronze medalists for the Russian Olympic Committee athletes
Sportspeople from Kurgan Oblast
21st-century Russian women